The University of North Alabama (UNA) is a public university in Florence, Alabama. It is the state's oldest public university. Occupying a  campus in a residential section of Florence, UNA is located within a four-city area that also includes Tuscumbia, Sheffield and Muscle Shoals.  The four cities compose a metropolitan area with a combined population of 140,000 people.

The University of North Alabama was founded as LaGrange College in 1830. It was reestablished in 1872 as the first state-supported teachers college south of the Ohio River. A year later, it became one of the nation's first coeducational colleges.

History 

LaGrange College opened on January 11, 1830, in a mountain hamlet a few miles south of Leighton in northeast Colbert County, Alabama. LaGrange means "The Barn" in French.  Twenty-one local college trustees were listed in Acts of Alabama, Eleventh Annual Session.

The town of LaGrange and its college were sacked and burned by Union troops in 1863. But by then, however, the college had moved north across the Tennessee River to Florence. The section of Franklin County containing LaGrange Mountain is now Colbert County. LaGrange College, which became Florence Wesleyan University in 1855, is now the University of North Alabama.

LaGrange College arose from the idea offered at a November 28, 1826 meeting of the Tennessee Conference of the Methodist Episcopal Church to establish a college which would not be "religious or theological". By January 1829, the selection of Lawrence Hill on LaGrange Mountain was made for the site of the school.

A year later, LaGrange College opened to students of all denominations in two three-story brick buildings.

The Rev. Robert Paine was the first president. The North Carolina native was also the professor of moral science and belles lettres and taught geography and mineralogy. He was assisted by two other professors. The first board of trustees had a total of 50 members, including two Native Americans, a Choctaw politician and a Cherokee leader. In 1830, Turner Saunders, a native of Virginia, was the first president of the board of trustees. Saunders' mansion, built around 1826, still stands in Lawrence County. Among the many distant trustees was John Coffee of Florence, friend of Andrew Jackson.  Among the local trustees was Henry Stuart Foote of Tuscumbia, who would move to Mississippi and defeat Jefferson Davis in the 1850 Governor's election.

In 1850, a grammar school was added to LaGrange College. (Today, UNA's Kilby Laboratory School is the only university-owned and operated elementary laboratory school in Alabama. In 1858, following the death of the school's president and the loss of most of its students to nearby Florence, the college was suspended and re-established as the LaGrange College and Military Academy, with James W. Robertson as superintendent. Under its new name, additional buildings were constructed and the school reached its highest prosperity. The state of Alabama made provision for two cadets from each county to be enrolled, and by 1861 47 of its 171 students were state cadets. The school suffered a loss of enrollment again when Alabama seceded, and in March 1862 Robertson received approval from the Alabama governor to enroll the 35th Alabama Infantry from faculty, cadets, and enlistees from surrounding counties.

On April 28, 1863, the buildings were destroyed by Union soldiers of the 10th Missouri Cavalry, including a library of 4,000 volumes.

Among LaGrange's alumni were several generals, Alabama governors Edward A. O'Neal and David P. Lewis, Alabama Supreme Court justice William M. Byrd and U.S. Senator Jeremiah Clemens, who wrote the first American Civil War novel and the first western novel.

Florence Wesleyan University
LaGrange graduate Dr. Richard H. Rivers, after becoming president of the college, led most of the students and all but one faculty member from the mountain in late 1854 to relocate to Florence. The school was re-incorporated as Florence Wesleyan University.

Admission to Florence Wesleyan required an acquaintance with English grammar, arithmetic, geography and the Latin and Greek Grammar.  Prospective students also were required to demonstrate an ability to translate four books of Caesar's Gallic Wars, six books of Virgil's Aeneid, Jacob's or Felton's Greek Reader, and at least one of Xenophon's Anabasis.

One hundred and sixty students enrolled in the first year of operation (1855) of Florence Wesleyan University. The school quickly attracted students from five states and two foreign countries. Among Florence Wesleyan's graduates were Alabama governor Emmet O'Neal and Texas governor Lawrence Sullivan "Sul" Ross (the latter of whose tenure as president of Texas A&M University was known as the 'golden age' of that institution). Ross also is the namesake of Sul Ross State University in Alpine, Texas.

The Civil War

The American Civil War bestowed much hardship on the institution. Robert A. Young, president of Florence Wesleyan at the time, is credited with saving the institution from destruction.

Florence Wesleyan alumnus Lawrence "Sul" Ross, the future Texas governor and university educator, served as a general in the Confederate States Army.  LaGrange College and Florence Wesleyan University also produced three other Civil War generals: Confederate Generals Edward A. O'Neal (later an Alabama governor) and John Gregg and Union General Daniel McCook Jr.

State Normal School at Florence

When the Methodist Church deeded Florence Wesleyan to the State of Alabama in 1872, the institution became the State Normal School at Florence, the first state-supported teachers college south of the Ohio River. Shortly thereafter, it became one of the first co-educational institutions in the nation. A year after its becoming a state school, the institution opened its doors to women; however, none attended until 1874, when 31 young women enrolled. The first woman joined the faculty in 1879.

Florence Normal School's Newton W. Bates, professor of language and literature, published his History of Civil Government of Alabama in 1892, the first textbook on the history of Alabama.

T.S. Stribling, one of the university's most noteworthy alumni, graduated from Florence State Normal School in 1903. He is recognized as one of the leaders of the Southern Renaissance for his novels Birthright, The Forge, The Store and the Unfinished Cathedral. The Pulitzer prize-winning novelist and author outsold contemporaries William Faulkner and Ernest Hemingway during the interwar period of the 1920s and 1930s.

Florence State Teachers College
The institution functioned as a normal school for more than 50 years until 1929, when it became a state teachers college offering a four-year curriculum in elementary education.

The first bachelor's degrees were awarded in 1931.  Less than a decade later, the curriculum was expanded to include a four-year course of study in secondary education.  In 1947, the curriculum was expanded again to include A.B. and B.S. degree programs in fields other than teacher training.

Florence State College
Progress continued apace toward the comprehensive university the institution would ultimately become.  In 1956, the institution crossed another academic milestone with the formation of a graduate course of study in education leading to the Master of Arts degree.  With the establishment of a new Graduate Division, the graduate program was launched in the summer of 1957. The same year, the Alabama Legislature voted to change the institution's name to Florence State College to reflect its expanding academic mission.

Integration at Florence State College

Compared with other southern institutions of higher learning, particularly the universities of Alabama and Mississippi, integration occurred almost painlessly at Florence State College.

In 1963, Wendell Wilkie Gunn became the first African-American student to enroll at the college. Gunn had initially been denied admission. Then-President E.B. Norton sent Gunn a letter informing him that the Alabama Legislature and Board of Education would not allow the college to accept his application.  Speaking at UNA in 2005, famed civil rights attorney Fred Gray, who represented Gunn, recalled that the hearing that integrated UNA lasted only ten minutes, after which Gunn returned to campus and enrolled.  Gray described the episode as "the easiest case of my civil rights career."

Gunn, who subsequently earned degrees from Florence State College and the University of Chicago, went on to a distinguished career in banking and finance, including an appointment as international trade adviser to President Ronald Reagan in 1982. Wendell Gunn was appointed to the board of trustees of the University of North Alabama by Governor Kay Ivey in 2019.

Florence State University

In 1967 the Alabama Legislature removed jurisdiction for the college from the State Board of Education and vested it in a board of trustees.  A year later, the new board voted for another name change to Florence State University, once again symbolizing the steady expansion of the institution's academic offerings and mission.

Ethelbert Brinkley "E.B." Norton, who was serving as president at the time this name was adopted, is distinguished as the only president in the university's history to preside over three institutional name changes: Florence State Teachers College, followed by Florence State College in 1957, and, roughly a decade later, by Florence State University.

The change of name also was accompanied by an extensive reorganization of the university's academic and administrative structure, including the establishment of separate schools within the university.

The University of North Alabama

Less than a decade later, on August 15, 1974, the university underwent another change of name to the University of North Alabama, symbolizing its coming of age as a comprehensive, regional university. The following year, the graduate curriculum again was expanded with the introduction of the master's degree program in business administration.

Following a reorganization in 1991, the university's administrative structure consists of four divisions: Academic Affairs, Business Affairs, Student Affairs and Advancement, each headed by a vice president.  In 1993, the Board of Trustees, anticipating continued and steady enrollment growth, adopted a new master facilities plan to ensure that UNA will be equipped to accommodate 10,000 students.

Dr. Kenneth D. Kitts became the 20th president of the University of North Alabama in March 2015. Kitts formerly worked as provost at the University of North Carolina at Pembroke. Kitts also taught at Francis Marion University in South Carolina, the University of South Carolina, and Appalachian State University in North Carolina.

Campus 

The UNA campus is adjacent to the Seminary-O'Neal Historic District, named for the street on which the Synodical Female College was located and for two Alabama governors.  The district, which is listed in the National Register of Historic Places, also is noted for its residential structures, built between 1908 and 1943 and representing a wide array of architectural styles.

UNA's campus facilities master plan was developed by the Olmsted Brothers, the sons of the architect who designed New York City's Central Park. A copy of the original Olmsted plan is permanently displayed in the President's Office in 601 Cramer Way.

The campus has three antebellum structures: Wesleyan Hall; Rogers Hall; and Coby Hall. All three are listed in the National Historic Register.

Mitchell Burford Science and Technology Building

The UNA Science and Engineering Technology Building was completed in 2015.  The five-story, 160,000-square-foot facility was designed by Lambert Ezell Durham Architects and constructed by BL Harbert,  The state-of-the-art building houses engineering technology,  biology, chemistry, occupational health science, physics and earth science.  It also includes conference areas, faculty offices, research facilities, specialized classrooms, a dining area, computer laboratories, super laboratories and lecture halls.  The UNA Science and Engineering Technology Building is a FEMA rated storm shelter capable of withstanding an F5 tornado. In June 2018, the building was renamed the Mitchell Burford Science and Technology Building in honor of Dr. Mitchell Burford, the largest individual private donor in the university's history.

Wendell W. Gunn University Commons

The Wendell W. Gunn University Commons was completed in 2014 and is located between Rogers Hall and Keller Hall at the north end of Court Street.  The $8 million complex houses the University Success Center, Student Financial Services, the UNA branch of Listerhill Credit Union, Starbucks and Chick-fil-A.  The Wendell W. Gunn University Commons was designed by Hugo Dante and Create Architects, and was built by Consolidated Construction. In March 2018, the building was renamed the Wendell W. Gunn University Commons in honor of Wendell Gunn, the first African-American student to enter Florence State College (now the University of North Alabama) in 1963.

Mattielou and Olive Residence Halls

Mattielou and Olive residence halls were completed in fall 2015 and spring 2016, respectively.  The new residence halls are located on the extreme north end of campus, behind Covington and Hawthorne halls.  Mattielou has 335 spaces and Olive has 429 spaces. These buildings were built primarily for incoming freshmen students.  There are double and limited single rooms and each unit has its own bathroom.

Laura Harrison Plaza

Harrison Plaza was made possible by 1955 alumna Laura McAnally Harrison and her husband, Dr. Donald C. Harrison, of Cincinnati.  The plaza, constructed around a large Italian limestone fountain, occupies the former intersections of Morrison and Wesleyan Avenues and Seminary Street between 601 Cramer Way, Keller Hall and the George H. Carroll Lion Habitat, which houses UNA's live mascots.  Harrison Plaza now constitutes the hub of UNA's three pedestrian walkways and serves as the principal entrance to campus.

Wesleyan Hall and Bell

With its distinctive towers, Wesleyan Hall, one of UNA's most familiar structures, is considered one of the most eminent landmarks in North Alabama. The Gothic Revival structure was designed to serve LaGrange College when this Methodist institution relocated from Franklin to Lauderdale county and was renamed Florence Wesleyan University.  During the Civil War, Wesleyan Hall was occupied by both Union and Confederate armies. General William Tecumseh Sherman is considered the most famous Civil War-era occupant of Wesleyan Hall.

After the war, the building was deeded to the state of Alabama and thereafter served as a state normal school. It currently serves as the center for Foreign Languages (French, German, and Spanish), Psychology, and Geography.

Wesleyan Hall houses personal effects and mementoes of former Alabama Supreme Court Chief Justice and U.S. Senator Howell Heflin, a native of nearby Tuscumbia.  The building is listed in the National Register of Historic Places.

Adjacent to Wesleyan Hall in a specially constructed tower is the Wesleyan Bell, which tolled regularly throughout the last quarter of the 19th century to summon Florence Normal School students to class.  Sometime around 1910, the bell was removed from Wesleyan Hall and stored.  Rediscovered in 2002, the 130-year-old Wesleyan Bell was restored to a prominent place on campus following construction of the Smith Bell Tower in 2004.

Rogers Hall (Courtview)

Rogers Hall, another one of UNA's most distinctive structures, was constructed by planter George Washington Foster in 1855 at the summit of Court Street (hence its original name, Courtview).  Because construction would result in the permanent obstruction of a major thoroughfare, the city had to secure the approval of the Alabama Legislature before work could begin. In the fall of 1864, the residence served as the headquarters of Confederate Gen. Nathan Bedford Forrest.  Courtview was occupied by members of the Foster family until 1900, when it became the home of Alabama Gov. Emmet O'Neal.  In the 1920s, the residence was acquired by Thomas M. Rogers Sr., and in 1948 by the university. It houses the Offices of Advancement, Alumni Relations, and Communications and Marketing.

601 Cramer Way

Constructed in 1930, 601 Cramer Way houses UNA's senior administrative offices.

The building is named for David Bibb Graves (1873–1942), who served as Alabama's governor from 1927 to 1931 and 1935–39. Graves proved unsuccessful in his early political career, but eventually he used his connections and leadership in the Ku Klux Klan to propel his ascendancy to the Governor's office. Once in office, Graves's passage of the largest education budget in Alabama history led to the moniker as the "Education Governor", Graves's support for education led to recognition on virtually every Alabama college campus.

The Office of the President, Executive Vice President for Academic Affairs and Provost, Vice President for Business and Financial Affairs, Human Resources, and the College of Arts, Sciences, and Engineering are housed in the building.

Coby Hall

Coby Hall was donated to the university in 1990 by David Brubaker in memory of his wife, Coby Stockard Brubaker.  Built by John Simpson on the site of his earlier home in 1843, the Simpson House/Irvine Place, as it had been known, later was purchased by George W. Foster, builder of Courtview, for his daughter, Virginia, and her husband, James B. Irvine.

The University Admissions office is located in the building. Coby Hall is listed in the National Register of Historic Places.

The Guillot University Center

The Robert M. Guillot University Center is named after UNA's former president, who served from 1972 to 1989.

Popularly known as the "GUC," it houses the Post Office, 256 Grill, Moe's Southwest Grill, Panda Express and the Lion's Den Game Room (a recreational center where students can play video games, table tennis, or pool). The GUC also houses the Student Engagement Office, the Vice President for Student Affairs Office, Student Conduct, Title IX, University Case Manager, Career Planning, the University Center Operations and Event Management Office, Disability Student Services, UNA Dining, Military and Veterans Services, University Ombudsman, Division of Diversity, Equity, and Inclusion, PMA Program and the Student Government Association. The Performance Center, located on the second floor, hosts a variety of events including concerts and comedy acts.

Collier Library

Collier Library is named in memory of Dr. C.B. Collier, Dean of Florence State Teacher's College from 1918 to 1946. Notable items in the 350,000-volume library include the collections of several musicians, actors, and writers, including W.C. Handy, acclaimed the world over as "father of the blues." The Pulitzer Prize Certificate and Collection of T.S. Stribling, one of the South's premiere novelists and an alumnus of Florence Normal School, is housed in the library.

Script collections include those of science fiction author Ray Bradbury and actors Lucas Black, Ernest Borgnine, Tom Cherones, Elinor Donahue and Noble Willingham.  Also included are the memorabilia of science fiction writer Forrest Ackerman.

Collier Library is the location of the George Lindsey Television and Film Collection, part of which is displayed in Norton Auditorium. In 2018 the library launched the UNA Scholarly Repository, a digital repository of the research and scholarly output of UNA faculty and students.

The Memorial Amphitheater

The Memorial Amphitheater, located on the grassy commons between Guillot University Center and Collier Library, is another one of the most familiar sites on the University of North Alabama campus.  Erected in 1934 as a memorial to World War I veterans, the amphitheater is used for outdoor plays, concerts and speeches.  Much like the nearby Guillot Center, it is a popular site for socializing, lounging and studying between classes.

Opler Clock

The Opler Clock is located on Waterloo Road between Floyd Science Building and LaGrange Hall.

Keller Hall

Originally a men's dormitory, Keller Hall, constructed in 1947, is named after Dr. James Albert Keller, who served as president of Florence State Teachers College from 1938 to 1948.

Keller Hall serves as the headquarters of UNA's College of Business & Technology, housing the dean, faculty offices, computer labs and classrooms, as well as the Steele Center for Professional Selling.

Keller Hall underwent a significant expansion following dedication of the Raburn Wing in 2002.  This new addition provides state-of-the-art classrooms and related space for the College of Business & Technology.

Willingham Hall

Originally a women's dormitory, Willingham Hall, named after long-serving President Henry J. Willingham, was constructed by the Works Projects Administration in 1939.  Willingham Hall houses the Department of English, the Department of History, and the Department of Politics, Justice, Law, and Philosophy. It stands on the site of the old Locust Dell Academy, founded by Nicholas Marcellus Hentz and commemorated by a historical marker.

The President's Home

The President's Home, completed in 1941, was constructed by the Works Projects Administration. Occupied by President and Mrs. Kenneth Kitts, the residence is located next to the George H. Carroll Lion Habitat, home of Leo III and Una, the university's live lion mascots.  Overnight guests often are awakened by the lions' roaring.

East Campus

The University of North Alabama encompasses two campuses, following a decision in June 2006, by the university's board of trustees to purchase J.W. Powell School from the Florence City Schools.  The East Campus houses several academic units, including the Office of Continuing Studies and Outreach and the Human Environmental Sciences' state-of-the-art Culinary Facility. The Culinary Arts program is the only four-year Culinary Program in a public institution of higher learning in Alabama.

Academic organization

Classification and accreditation

According to the Carnegie Classifications of Institutions of Higher Education, the University of North Alabama is considered an M1; Master's Colleges and Universities: Larger Programs. UNA is a mid-sized, four year institution accredited by the Southern Association of Colleges and Schools Commission on Colleges.

Degrees conferred 
The University of North Alabama's five colleges offer degree programs in more than 80 different areas of study. UNA conferred 1,304 undergraduate degrees and 643 graduate degrees in the 2020–2021 academic year.

Cum laude honors are conferred to graduates with a GPA of 3.5-3.69.  Magna cum laude honors are conferred with a GPA of 3.70-3.89.  Summa cum laude honors are conferred with a GPA of 3.9 or higher.

Programs 
The University of North Alabama offers 219 bachelor's degree programs and concentrations, 45 master's degree programs, 3 education specialist degree programs, 1 doctoral program, and 4 micro-credentials. UNA is composed of five colleges:

Colleges:

 Anderson College of Nursing and Health Professions
 College of Arts, Sciences, and Engineering
 College of Business and Technology
 College of Education and Human Sciences
 Delores and Weldon Cole Honors College

Kilby School
The College of Education and Human Sciences oversees the Kilby Laboratory School (child development center, kindergarten through sixth grade).  The vision of Kilby Laboratory School is to serve as a site for university students to engage in meaningful interdisciplinary teaching, research, and service opportunities.

Academic calendar
The university follows a standard academic calendar based on the semester system, which divides the academic year, starting in mid-August, into two 15 week semesters (fall and spring) and the summer. The fall semester ends in December and the spring term lasts from January to early May. The summer, which lasts from mid-May to August, is divided into 3-week "mini-semesters" in May and two four-week sessions in June and July, respectively. Also, some programs offer "mini-semesters" within the fall and spring, concluding courses in 8 weeks instead of the typical 15–16 week course. UNA also debuted a new Winter Session "mini-semester" in 2018.

Libraries

The university libraries include Collier Library (main library), the Learning Resources Center located in Stevens Hall, the Music Library located in the Music Building and the Kilby School Library.  The combined holdings of the libraries provide users with access to literature from a wide range of disciplines and include newer formats such as streaming media. Materials not found in the libraries are available through interlibrary loan.  Library instruction sessions tailored to meet the needs of individual classes may be scheduled through the library.  Common topics include location books and articles, searching the Internet, and evaluation information sources.

International emphasis

According to the tenth edition of American Universities and Colleges, published in 1968 by the American Council on Education, the University of North Alabama, then known as Florence State College, had only three international students enrolled during the 1966–1967 academic year — two undergraduate students and one graduate student, all from the Middle East.  However, during the Robert Potts administration, UNA undertook a concerted effort to diversify its student body by recruiting individuals from throughout the world.  By 2004, international enrollment had grown to nearly 300 students representing 35 countries.

Today, UNA has the third highest international student enrollment of any institution in its category according to U.S. News & World Reports America's Best Colleges. Roughly 4 percent of the UNA student body is international. The Global Lions Organization has become one of the largest and most influential student organizations on campus.  A major focus of the GLO is organizing campus and community activities to integrate international students more closely with other UNA students and also with the surrounding Shoals community.

Student body 
The table below displays the Fall 2021 Gender/Ethnic Breakdown of Students for the University of North Alabama.

Full-time, four-year undergraduates comprise a large amount of the total university enrollment. In Fall 2021, 72% of all students were considered full-time and 28% were considered part-time. Total enrollment for the Fall 2021 semester was 8,832. Total enrollment for the Fall 2020 semester was 8,361. In regards to source of student, 70.5% of students came from within the state of Alabama, 21.0% were from out-of-state areas, and 8.5% were considered international students in Fall 2021.

Media

The Diorama, UNA's student-run yearbook.
The Flor-Ala, named after Florence, Alabama, has functioned as the school newspaper since 1931.  Published in 29 issues each year, the paper is run by UNA students who serve in all facets of news gathering, writing and production. The Flor-Ala is a member of the Associated Collegiate Press.
Lights & Shadows, published once a year, is the university's literary and art magazine, and was started as a publication of the Florence State Teachers College English Club in 1956.
UNA Magazine, UNA's alumni magazine, is published bi-annually.

Athletics

UNA operated a collegiate athletic program in NCAA Division II's Gulf South Conference for almost fifty years as a founding member of the conference. The North Alabama Lions football, men's basketball, women's volleyball, and softball teams have each won national championships.

UNA operates 14 varsity teams, which have collected more than 40 conference championships, dozens of No. 1 national rankings and seven national titles.

As of July 1, 2018, UNA began its transition to Division I as a member of the ASUN Conference in 2018. Since the ASUN does not sponsor football, the football team will become an independent in the second level of D-I football, the Football Championship Subdivision, at the same time. The following year, UNA will become a football-only member of the FCS Big South Conference.

Greek life

The university's embryonic Greek community initially was housed in O'Neal Hall, which was demolished in the 1980s to clear space for the construction of the Guillot University Center.

Fraternities
Robert Guillot, president from 1972 to 1989, accurately could be described as the father of UNA Greek life.  He chose seven national fraternities to colonize UNA, stipulating that all chapter colonies had to be granted charters by November 1, 1974. Failure meant dissolution and replacement by new groups, which, in turn, could petition the same or other selected national fraternities for affiliation.

The threat apparently worked. Chartered fraternity chapters - Alpha Tau Omega, Delta Chi, Kappa Sigma, Phi Gamma Delta, Pi Kappa Alpha, Lambda Chi Alpha (closed 1981) and Sigma Chi - began acquiring off-campus lodges that over time were upgraded to or replaced by fraternity houses. Kappa Sigma's Lambda-Omicron chapter was the first chapter to acquire an off-campus lodge, the site of the present-day Off-Campus Bookstore.

Kappa Sigma's Lambda-Omicron chapter was the first fraternity to construct a house on UNA's fraternity row, which opened on April 4, 1984.

Sigma Chi's Eta Rho Chapter at the University of North Alabama served as the international fraternities' first official colony. Eta Rho is the Alpha colony of Sigma Chi

In the Spring of 2017, the Alpha Chapter of Lambda Sigma Phi was established at UNA. Alpha Chapter was the first expansion chapter of Lambda Sigma Phi, which was established at the University of Alabama. Lambda Sigma Phi (commonly referred to as Lambda Sig) is a member of the Interfraternity Council, and is the only Christian fraternity at UNA.

Sororities
A similar strategy was followed with sorority recruitment.  As with the fraternities, invitations were extended to national sororities with the strongest alumni presence in the Florence area - Alpha Delta Pi, Alpha Gamma Delta, Alpha Omicron Pi (no longer on campus), Phi Mu, and Zeta Tau Alpha.

Young women interested in joining the emerging Greek system were encouraged to sign up for recruitment and subsequently were divided into several groups to visit rooms on campus assigned to sorority recruiters.  In the interest of fairness, only four alumnae could be present in each of these rooms while recruiting occurred.

Alpha Delta Chi Christian Sisterhood at UNA was founded in 2006. The group functions as a student organization outside the Greek system.

Greek system today
President Guillot's decision to organize a UNA Greek system was greeted with strong opposition by some segments of the administration.  Previous attempts to establish a Greek community had been resisted for years.

Nevertheless, after more than two generations, UNA Greek life is alive and well, even though fraternities and sororities combined represent slightly less than 10 percent of the undergraduate student population. Despite these comparatively small numbers, Greeks historically have exerted a major influence on virtually every facet of student life at UNA.

Inter-Fraternity Council

 Alpha Tau Omega, Founded January 1974
 Delta Chi, Founded September 2006
 Kappa Sigma, Founded May 4, 1974
 Lambda Sigma Phi, Founded April 23, 2017
 Phi Gamma Delta, Founded March 23, 1974
 Pi Kappa Alpha, Founded March 3, 1974
 Sigma Alpha Epsilon, Founded February 24, 1989
 Sigma Chi, Founded April 20, 1974

Collegiate Panhellenic Council
 Alpha Delta Pi, Founded February 17, 1973
 Alpha Gamma Delta, Founded 1975
 Phi Mu, Founded March 2, 1973
 Zeta Tau Alpha, Founded March 3, 1973

National Pan-Hellenic Council
 Alpha Phi Alpha, local chapter founded January 17, 1975
 Kappa Alpha Psi, local chapter founded October 10, 1976
 Phi Beta Sigma, local chapter founded December 4, 2010 (initially colonized December 2, 1998)
 Alpha Kappa Alpha, local chapter founded December 7, 1980
 Delta Sigma Theta, local chapter founded April 12, 1980
 Zeta Phi Beta, local chapter founded November 22, 2003

Student life

School colors
Purple and gold are the school colors of the University of North Alabama.  While they are a ubiquitous sight on campus and especially at UNA athletic events, no one has ever ascertained who or what inspired their adoption. Little in the school archives accounts for the origin of these colors, according to Cecil Nabors, a UNA archivist and associate professor. All that is certain is that the 1912 yearbook, published the same year as inauguration of the football team, was named the "Purple and Gold."

UNA Fight Song

The "UNA Fight Song" is the fight song of the University of North Alabama, and is played by the Marching Pride of North Alabama. The song is based on one of three songs called "Three School Songs," which was published in the 1960s. The lyrics were chosen by band members in the late 1970s.

"Lion Pride" and "Pride Rock"

"Lion Pride" is a term frequently used by members of the UNA community to describe commitment to school traditions and activities reflected among students, alumni and friends of the university.

Perhaps nowhere is this level of commitment more strongly expressed than in the university's Pride Rock tradition, which began in 1994. Pride Rock is a 69-pound, engraved granite stone bearing the actual paw print of Leo II, UNA's second live lion mascot.  Placed just behind the north end zone of all UNA home games, Pride Rock is touched by players as they file past on their way to the field.  Pride Rock serves not only as a motivational tool for the players but also as a tangible expression of the deep well of pride, community and tradition associated with the University of North Alabama and particularly with its athletic program.

UNA's mascot

Leos I and II

On July 22, 1974, former UNA president Dr. Robert M. Guillot brought a 35-pound lion cub to the campus and Leo spent the next 14 years "roaring" the school to victory. The original Leo died on January 20, 1988, and a great outpouring of support from the Shoals community resulted in Leo II being brought to UNA in July 1988. Leo II lived in the compound that once housed the original Leo and grew to a weight of more than 600 pounds at eleven years of age. In 1997, Leo II was selected as the nation's "Second Best Mascot" by Sports Illustrated. He died in February 2000.

Leo III and Una

UNA has the only live Lion mascot in the country living on campus. Leo III, born on November 18, 2002, resides on the campus in the  George H. Carroll Lion Habitat. Leo III had lived on campus with his sister, Una, who died on June 30, 2020, at the age of 17 after a brief illness. UNA's other mascots, students who don lion costumes (one male one female) to cheer the Lions and entertain the crowd, also represent the school at athletic games and other university functions. Tryouts are held each year and the identity of the students are kept secret for as long as possible.

Miss UNA Scholarship Pageant

The Miss UNA Scholarship Pageant is an official preliminary for the Miss Alabama/Miss America Pageant. The Miss UNA Scholarship pageant has been a UNA tradition for over 31 years. The pageant provides an opportunity for the university's young women to compete in the following categories for scholarship money and prizes. In 2007 over $12,000 in scholarships and prizes was awarded to the contestants. Each young woman is encouraged and mentored to develop skills that will enrich her personal and professional life beyond her university experience. Miss University of North Alabama spends her year in service to the university and Shoals Area community. She promotes the platform of her choice, makes official appearances as a university representative, and represents the university at the Miss Alabama Scholarship Pageant.

Spirit Hill Tailgating and Lion Walk

Within the past few years, pregame tailgating at Spirit Hill, an area adjoining Braly Municipal Stadium, has developed into a major UNA tradition, thanks largely to the efforts of former Athletic Director Joel Erdmann.  Erdmann enlisted the UNA Greek community, general student organizations and alumni to expand this tradition, which had been lacking.

Along with former head UNA football Coach Mark Hudspeth, Erdmann also was instrumental in developing the highly popular Lion Walk, a pregame parade down Royal Avenue (next to Spirit Hill) that includes Lion athletes, cheerleaders and the Marching Pride of North Alabama. The parade is held before every UNA home game.

UNA's Marching Pride of North Alabama

The Marching Pride of North Alabama was founded in 1949. The Marching Band has represented the university at many different events since, including a performance for President Jimmy Carter during his historic 1980 visit to neighboring Tuscumbia.

The band also appeared in the award-winning movie, Blue Sky, starring Jessica Lange, Tommy Lee Jones and Powers Boothe. The Marching Band also has recorded a CD with famed musician and producer Jimmy Johnson.

With more than 210 members, the group is the largest organization on campus and serves as a major contributor to school spirit, especially at athletic events.  The UNA Marching Band performs at all home football games, local parades and travels the state performing in exhibition at high school competitions.  They are known for precision marching and drill design, while entertaining with strongly played jazz standards.

Step Sing

In the spring, Step Sing is a well-attended event in Norton Auditorium sponsored by the University Program Council featuring take-offs of musical comedy production numbers by campus organizations. Money raised from ticket sales supports the local United Way.

UNA gallery

Notable people

Alumni and other former students of the University of North Alabama include business leaders; a number of governors, congressmen and other government and military leaders; professional athletes; artists and entertainers.

References

External links

 
Educational institutions established in 1830
Landmarks in Alabama
University of North
Universities and colleges accredited by the Southern Association of Colleges and Schools
1830 establishments in Alabama